The Hampton Roads Chamber of Commerce (a.k.a. Hampton Roads Chamber) is a business network comprising 2,500 businesses throughout the Hampton Roads region.  The mission of the chamber of commerce is to "create economic opportunity and prosperity" through public policy, economic development and service to the  business.  The chamber has five divisions: Chesapeake, Norfolk, Portsmouth, Suffolk and Virginia Beach.

Virginia Beach division

The Virginia Beach Division of the Chamber is one of the five divisions of the Hampton Roads Chamber of Commerce and seeks to establish partnerships and programs for marketing Virginia Beach's resources.

New headquarters for the Virginia Beach Division were built in 1974 under the leadership of Chamber of Commerce President Richard Kline, founder of RK Auto Group.  Under Richard Kline's tenure as Chamber of Commerce president, he also created the Neptune Festival in 1973 to celebrate the heritage of Virginia Beach.  By 1998, the festival was attracting more than one million attendees, bringing $15 million into the local economy.

The Virginia Beach Division was located at 222 Central Park Avenue, Suite 1010 in Virginia Beach (757-664-2575). but has since been relocated to the Hampton Roads Chamber's headquarters in Downtown Norfolk.

External links
Hampton Roads Chamber of Commerce
Virginia Chamber of Commerce
The Neptune Festival Official Website
Hampton Roads Chamber of Commerce

References

Hampton Roads
Chambers of commerce in the United States